The following is a list of episodes of Coffee Prince, a Filipino romantic-comedy series adapted by Des Garbes Severino, which premiered on GMA Network on October 8, 2012 on GMA Telebabad block. The series ended on November 23, 2012, with the total of thirty five episodes.

The series is based on Sun-mi Lee's novel and MBC's 2007 hit Korean television series, The 1st Shop of Coffee Prince. The series is directed by Ricky Davao.

The forty-five-minute scripted drama follows the lives and loves of Andy, a girl who disguises herself as a man just to get the job in a coffee shop and Arthur, a happy-go-lucky and wealthy bachelor whose paternal grandmother pushes him to settle down and start a family. In order to avoid the constant request from his relatives, he will hire Andy to pretend as his gay lover without even knowing that the latter is a real woman.

Plot
A romance brews between the most unlikely of couples at a coffee shop—Andy is a tomboy who works at the coffee shop owned by Arthur, the charming heir to a food and beverage company. Because of his good looks, Arthur is hounded by a lot of ladies, a situation he does not find amusing. To avoid this unwanted attention, Arthur pretends to be gay and woos Andy to be his fake lover, not knowing Andy's true identity.

Main casts

 Kris Bernal as Andrea "Andy" Gomez
 Aljur Abrenica as Arthur Ochoa
 Benjamin Alves as Errol Ochoa
 Max Collins as Arlene Manahan

List of episodes

References

External links
Official GMA Network website

Lists of Philippine drama television series episodes